The Seattle City Attorney is a non-partisan elected official in Seattle, Washington whose job is to "prosecute people for misdemeanor offenses, defend the city against lawsuits, and gives legal advice to the city". Since 2022, the position has been held by Ann Davison.

Departmental Organization
The City Attorney is the head of the Seattle City Law Department, a branch of the Seattle Municipal Government, and the fourth-largest public law office in Washington. There are approximately 90 staff attorneys and 65 support staff. They are split between four divisions: 
Civil: torts (claims), land use, environmental protection, employment, contracts & utilities, government affairs, and regulatory enforcement & economic justice
Criminal: traffic infractions, misdemeanors, and gross misdemeanors
Administration: human resources, information technology, budgeting, accounting, internships/externships (approximately 35 law students per year)
Precinct Liaison (with the Seattle Police Department): North, South, East, Southwest, Vice/Narcotics

The City Attorney receives a salary of $145,000 per year, making them only the 265th highest paid municipal employee (as of 2012).

The Law Department began issuing a digital newsletter in 2011.

List of City Attorneys
Ann Davison, 2022–present
Pete Holmes, 2010–2022
Tom Carr, 2002–2009
Mark Sidran, 1990–2002
Douglas Jewett, 1978–1989
John Harris, 1974–1977
A.L. Newbould, 1963–1973
A.C. Van Soelen, 1930–1963
Thomas Kennedy, 1924–1930
Walter F. Meier, 1918–1923

References

External links
  Official Website

Washington (state) city attorneys
Government of Seattle